Kim Hae-lin (born February 11, 1995) is a South Korean figure skater.

Career
Born in Gyeonggi-do, she competed at the 2010 World Junior Figure Skating Championships, where she placed 37th. She competed in the short program but could not advance to the free skate due to her low placement.

Programs

Competitive highlights

Detailed results

External links

South Korean female single skaters
1995 births
Living people
Sportspeople from Gyeonggi Province